The Sky Ranger is a 1928 American silent short film. Directed by Harry Joe Brown the film was an adventure film involving  the character of "flyboy" Russ Farrell.

Plot
Agent Russ Farrell (Reed Howes) of the U.S. Air Patrol, is assigned to the border patrol on the United States/Mexico border. He meets Nancy Feldmore (Marjorie Daw), who worries about his dangerous job.

Farrell flies to a rough border town, where Nancy's father, Senator Feldmore (Henry A. Barrows) is being held prisoner by Chinese smugglers.

Using his aircraft to good advantage, Farrell overcomes the smugglers, and frees the Senator, earning Nancy's gratitude.

Cast
 Reed Howes as Russ Farrell
 Marjorie Daw as Nancy Feldmore
 Roy Stewart as Captain Kennard
 Henry A. Barrows Senator Feldmore (credited as Henry Barrows)
 Bobby Dunn as Obie, the mechanic
 Tom Santschi as "Blackie" Williams
 Buck Black as Buck Feldmore

Production
The Sky Ranger was based on the popular "Russ Farrell" magazine stories, that appeared in The American Boy magazine. The films that were developed were part of a Russ Farrell, Aviator series stars Reed Howes as the dashing, devil-may-care flyboy hero.

Reception
The Sky Ranger was a short that would appear on the "bottom of the bill" as a B-film. The leading man, Reed Howes, was an expert stunt performer, but was not an aviator. Consequently, "most of the more dangerous flying stunts were performed by doubles. Diminutive short-subject "funster" Bobby Dunn provides marginal comic relief."

References

Notes

Citations

Bibliography

 Erisman, Fred. Boys' Books, Boys' Dreams, and the Mystique of Flight. Fort Worth, Texas: Texas Christian University Press, 2006. .
 Farmer, James H. Celluloid Wings: The Impact of Movies on Aviation. Blue Ridge Summit, Pennsylvania: Tab Books Inc., 1984. .
 Freese, Gene Scott. Hollywood Stunt Performers, 1910s-1970s: A Biographical Dictionary, 2d ed. Jefferson, North Carolina: McFarland & Company, Inc., 2014.  .
 Pendo, Stephen. Aviation in the Cinema. Lanham, Maryland: Scarecrow Press, 1985. .

External links
 
 

1928 films
American aviation films
American silent serial films
American black-and-white films
1920s American films